Zhanna Shubyonok (born 13 November 1970) is a Belarusian modern pentathlete. She competed in the women's individual event at the 2000 Summer Olympics.

References

1970 births
Living people
Belarusian female modern pentathletes
Olympic modern pentathletes of Belarus
Modern pentathletes at the 2000 Summer Olympics
Place of birth missing (living people)